Get Your Man is a 1934 British comedy film directed by George King and starring Dorothy Boyd, Sebastian Shaw and Clifford Heatherley. It is based on the play Tu m'epouseras by Louis Verneuil. It features the second screen appearance of future star Rex Harrison.

Plot
A determined young woman sets up an elaborate plan to secure the man she has fallen in love with.

Cast
 Dorothy Boyd - Nancy McAlpine
 Sebastian Shaw - Robert Halbean
 Clifford Heatherley - Parker Halbean
 Hugh E. Wright - Reverend John Vivien
 Kay Walsh - Mary Vivien
 Helen Ferrers - Agatha McAlpine
 Rex Harrison - Tom Jakes

References

External links

1934 films
1934 comedy films
British comedy films
Films based on works by Louis Verneuil
Films directed by George King
British remakes of American films
Sound film remakes of silent films
British black-and-white films
British and Dominions Studios films
Films shot at Imperial Studios, Elstree
1930s English-language films
1930s British films